Croagh is a small village in County Limerick, Ireland. The village was originally part of this route before construction of the Croagh by-pass in 1986. 

 in Irish means either "round hill" or "saffron". The village is in the agricultural area known as the Golden Vale.

See also
 List of towns and villages in County Limerick

References

External links
 Croagh National School
 Diocesan Heritage Project for Croagh-Kilfinny
 Croagh-Kilfinny GAA

Towns and villages in County Limerick